The 2001–02 Rose Bowl series was a women's cricket series held in Australia and New Zealand in February and March 2002. Australia and New Zealand played each other in six One Day Internationals, three in each country, with a points system to determine the winner. Australia won five out of the six matches, gaining 14 points to win the series.

Squads

Points table 

 Note: Teams were awarded 2 points for a home win and 3 points for an away win.
 Source: CricketArchive

New Zealand in Australia

1st ODI

2nd ODI

3rd ODI

Australia in New Zealand

4th ODI

5th ODI

6th ODI

References

External links 
Rose Bowl 2001/02 from Cricinfo

Women's international cricket tours of Australia
Women's international cricket tours of New Zealand
2002 in Australian cricket
2002 in New Zealand cricket
Australia women's national cricket team tours
New Zealand women's national cricket team tours